Scott Township is one of twelve townships in Steuben County, Indiana, United States. As of the 2010 census, its population was 1,111 and it contained 456 housing units.

Geography
Lakes in this township include Pigeon Lake.

Unincorporated towns
 Ellis at 
(This list is based on USGS data and may include former settlements.)

Adjacent townships
 Fremont Township (north)
 York Township (east)
 Otsego Township (south)
 Steuben Township (southwest)
 Pleasant Township (west)
 Jamestown Township (northwest)

Cemeteries
The township contains four cemeteries: Jones, Jordan, Kope and South Scott.

Major highways
  Interstate 80
  U.S. Route 20
  Indiana State Road 1
  Indiana State Road 827

References
 U.S. Board on Geographic Names (GNIS)
 United States Census Bureau cartographic boundary files

External links
 Indiana Township Association
 United Township Association of Indiana

Townships in Steuben County, Indiana
Townships in Indiana